The Monster Tour was a co-headlining concert tour by American rapper Eminem and Barbadian singer Rihanna. The tour began on August 7, 2014, at the Rose Bowl in Pasadena and concluded on August 23, 2014, at the Comerica Park in Detroit.

Background
Eminem and Rihanna first collaborated in 2010 with "Love the Way You Lie". Since then they have released three more collaborations: "Love the Way You Lie (Part II)" (2010), "Numb" (2012), and "The Monster" (2013).

In February 2014, it was announced that they would embark on a mini-tour. On March 19, 2014, it was confirmed that it would be called The Monster Tour and three dates were announced. Tickets went on sale to the general public on March 28, 2014. On March 21, 2014, three further dates were added to the tour due to popular demand.

Commercial performance
The Monster Tour was the one of the highest-grossing tours of 2014 in North America, with a gross of $36 million in only six shows. A total of 581,276 people attended (including outside the stadiums).

The two shows at MetLife Stadium in New Jersey grossed $12.4 million with 101, 941 people attending each concert. It was the sixth highest-grossing box office of the year in North America, only behind Billy Joel, George Strait, One Direction and Garth Brooks.

Set list
The following set list is taken from the concert held on August 7, 2014; at the Rose Bowl in Pasadena, California.

Rihanna songs
"Numb" 
"No Love"
"Run This Town" / "Renegade" / "Live Your Life"
"Crack a Bottle"
"Won't Back Down"
"What Now" 
"Phresh Out the Runway" 
"Birthday Cake" / "Talk That Talk" 
"Rude Boy" 
"What's My Name?" 
"Pour It Up" 
"Cockiness (Love It)" 
"Man Down" 
"You da One" 
"Wait Your Turn"
"Jump" 
"Umbrella" 
"All of the Lights" / "Rockstar 101"
”Only Girl (In The World)”
"Where Have You Been"
"Stay"
"Love the Way You Lie"

Eminem songs
"3 A.M." 
"Square Dance"
"Business" / "Kill You" 
"Evil Deeds" 
"Rap God" 
"Marshall Mathers" 
"Just Don't Give a Fuck"
"Still Don't Give a Fuck" / "Criminal" / "The Way I Am" 
"Airplanes, Part II" 
"Stan"
"Sing For The Moment" 
"Like Toy Soldiers" / "Forever" / "Berzerk" 
"Till I Collapse" 
"Cinderella Man" 
"My Name Is" 
"The Real Slim Shady" 
"Without Me" / "Not Afraid" 
"Diamonds" 
"We Found Love"
"Lose Yourself"
"The Monster"

Shows

References

2014 concert tours
Co-headlining concert tours
Eminem concert tours
Rihanna concert tours